Maiestas ismenias is a species of bugs from the Cicadellidae family that is endemic to Congo. It was formerly placed within Recilia, but a 2009 revision moved it to Maiestas.

References

Insects described in 1969
Insects of Africa
Maiestas